The  Delphian League was an English amateur football league covering Greater London and the surrounding area.

The league was formed in 1951 with 14 clubs and was effectively a level below the Corinthian League. Due to the severe winter during the 1962–63 season the league was abandoned and an emergency competition played in which the clubs were split into two groups, playing each other only once. The two champions, Edmonton and Hertford Town, met in a two-legged final, with Edmonton winning 5–2. At the end of the season both the Delphian League and the Corinthian League merged into the Athenian League, with the Corinthian League clubs forming Division One and Delphian League clubs forming Division Two.

List of champions

Member clubs
During its twelve-season history, the league had 28 member clubs:

Aveley
Aylesbury United
Berkhamsted Town
Bishop's Stortford
Brentwood & Warley
Cheshunt
Dagenham

Edmonton
Harlow Town
Harrow Town
Hemel Hempstead Town
Hertford Town
Histon
Hornchurch & Upminster

Leatherhead
Letchworth Town
Rainham Town
Slough Centre
Stevenage Town
Tilbury
Ware

Wembley
Willesden
Windsor & Eton
Wingate
Wokingham Town
Woodford Town
Yiewsley

See also
List of Delphian League seasons

References

 
Defunct football leagues in England
Football competitions in London
Athenian League